"Never Been to Spain" is a song written by Hoyt Axton, originally released on his 1971 LP Joy to the World and later that year performed by Three Dog Night, with Cory Wells on lead vocal. It was featured on their 1971 album Harmony. The recording was produced by Richard Podolor.

Background
The lyrics consist of the narrator ruminating about overseas locales that he has never visited, but about which he feels he has some proxy experience, primarily via the music but also due to other presumed highlights found there. He loosely compares his own actual travels to these more worldly spots.

In the final verse, he observes that while he has "never been to heaven", he has "been to Oklahoma", where he was told he was born, thus implying a kinship between the two places. Hoyt Axton, who was born in Oklahoma, explained that he originally wrote, "...in Oklahoma, born in a coma...." However, it was considered inappropriate; thus, the lyrics were changed to "not Arizona".

Chart history
In the US, "Never Been to Spain" peaked at number 5 on the Billboard chart, and number 18 on the U.S. adult contemporary chart in 1972. Outside of the US, "Never Been to Spain" reached number 3 in Canada and number 34 in Australia.

Weekly charts

Year-end charts

Other versions
 Elvis Presley, on his 1972 album  As Recorded at Madison Square Garden.
 Ronnie Sessions, as a single in 1972 that reached number 36 on the Billboard Country chart.
 Cher, on her 1972 album Foxy Lady.
 Waylon Jennings, on his 1972 album Ladies Love Outlaws and in the 2007 concert film Never Say Die: The Final Concert and its soundtrack.
 Ike & Tina Turner, on their 1977 album Delilah's Power.
 Cravin' Melon, on their 1998 EP Squeeze Me.
 The No Refund Band recorded a cover popular in the west coast swing community.
 ApologetiX did a parody of the song entitled "Never Been to Spain (Yet)" that was featured on their 2007 live album Chosen Ones.
 The Oklahoma State University Cowboy Marching Band plays a version of the song every football game during the first time out of the fourth quarter, as well as at numerous other events throughout each academic year. It has been recorded in several of their performance albums. The entire marching band and stadium of fans yell "State" in unison following the line "I've never been to heaven, but I've been to Oklahoma".

References

1971 songs
1971 singles
1972 singles
Songs written by Hoyt Axton
Three Dog Night songs
Elvis Presley songs
Cher songs
Ike & Tina Turner songs
Waylon Jennings songs
Dunhill Records singles
MGM Records singles
Songs about music
Songs about Oklahoma
Songs about Spain